The Young America Cricket Club Invitation was a late 19th-century men's grass court tennis tournament held at the Young America Cricket Club (YACC), Stanton, Philadelphia, Pennsylvania, United States from 1885 to 1895.

History
In 1855 the Young America Cricket Club (YACC) was founded. In 1885 the club inugurated an inviational men's tennis tournament known as the Young America Cricket Club Invitation. This important event was only held for three editions. The tournament was discontinued as following the merger of the Young America Cricket Club with another famous venue the Germantown Cricket Club in 1889.

Finals

Mens singles

Notes

References

Grass court tennis tournaments
Defunct tennis tournaments in the United States